Mary Green Glacier is in Wenatchee National Forest in the U.S. state of Washington, on the east slopes of Bonanza Peak, the tallest non-volcanic peak in the Cascade Range. Mary Green Glacier was named after the wife of a prospector and lies along the most popular route to the summit of Bonanza Peak.

See also
List of glaciers in the United States

References

Glaciers of the North Cascades
Glaciers of Chelan County, Washington
Glaciers of Washington (state)